Events in the year 1931 in India.

Incumbents
 Emperor of India – George V
 Viceroy of India – The Lord Irwin 
 Viceroy of India – The Earl of Willingdon (from 18 April)

Events
 National income - 26,389 million
 25 January – Mohandas Gandhi released again.
 January – The All-Asian Women's Conference (AAWC) takes place in Lahore.
 13 February – New Delhi becomes the capital of India.
 27 February – Chandrasekhar Azad martyrdom in an encounter with the British in Allahabad.
 4 March – British viceroy of India and Mohandas Gandhi negotiate.
 23 March – Independent India leaders Bhagat Singh, Rajguru and Sukhdev are hanged by the British Government.
 October, November – Mohandas Gandhi visits England.
 4 November – Inauguration of the Thiruvananthapuram Central Railway station by the Maharaja of Travancore Sree Chithira Thirunal
 6 November – Indian spiritual leader Meher Baba arrives in America for the first time.
 2nd Round Table Conference
 Charka was adopted on centre of the flag by INC (Indian National Congress)

Law
 5 March – Gandhi Irwin Pact
Bijni Succession Act
Indian Tolls (Amendment) Act
Provisional Collection of Taxes Act

Births
4 January – Nirupa Roy, actress (died 2004).
3 February – Charanjit Singh, hockey player (died 2022).
16 May – K. Natwar Singh, politician and Minister.
27 May – O. N. V. Kurup, poet (died 2016).
20 June – Zia Mohyeddin, Pakistani actor and broadcaster (died 2023).
25 June – V. P. Singh, Prime Minister of India (died 2008).
17 July – B. V. Nimbkar, agricultural scientist and social worker (died 2021).
26 July – S. L. Bhyrappa, novelist.
27 August – Sri Chinmoy, spiritual teacher and philosopher (died 2007).
16 September – E. C. George Sudarshan, physicist, author and professor. (died 2018)
26 September – Vijay Manjrekar, cricketer (died 1983) 
15 October – Abdul Kalam, eleventh President of India.(died 2015)
21 October – Shammi Kapoor, actor (died 2011).

Full date unknown

Satyen Kappu, actor (died 2007).
Romila Thapar, historian

Deaths
23 March – Shivaram Rajguru, revolutionary, executed (born 1908).
23 March – Bhagat Singh, freedom fighter, executed (born 1907).
23 March – Sukhdev Thapar, revolutionary, executed (born 1907).
7 July – Dinesh Gupta, freedom fighter and revolutionary, executed (born 1911).

References

 
India
Years of the 20th century in India